The Moderate Party, collectively called Moderates, was an Italian pre-Unification political rally, active during the Risorgimento (1815–1861). The Moderates were never a formal party, but only a movement of liberal-minded reformist patriots, usually secular, from politics, military, literature and philosophy.

History
Since the Congress of Vienna, inside the Italian Peninsula was diffused a reformist and Romantic moment, inspired from Jacobonism and Bonapartism and exposed in the revolutions of 1820 against the reactionary Congress System. Many patriots, soldiers and intellectuals who took part in the revolutions were defined as "moderates".

The Moderates, with time, demarcated themselves from radical and republican organizations like Giuseppe Mazzini's Young Italy, Carboneria and others. The moderates and radicals mainly disagreed on the methods to unite Italy: the Moderates supported secret pacts and strategic alliances between the patriotic movement and the other European powers, whereas Mazzini's supporters called a popular revolution to establish a democratic Republic. 
After the failure of the Italian Revolutions of 1848, attempted by Mazzinians and republicans, the republican ideas declined for the Moderates' agenda.
During this time, several politicians of other Italian states are members of the group: in the Kingdom of Sardinia, the leaders were Massimo d'Azeglio and Camillo Benso, Count of Cavour, representing the parliamentary Right, and Urbano Rattazzi, representing the Left; in the Papal States the reform movement was headed by Terenzio della Rovere and Pellegrino Rossi, the last murdered by a republican plot in 1848; in the Kingdom of the Two Sicilies prominent moderates were brothers Bertrando and Silvio Spaventa.
When the Kingdom of Italy was founded in 1861, the moderates merged in the Historical Right and Left, the two Piedmontese parliamentary group that monopolized the politics of the new Italian state for almost half-century.

Tendencies and members
Differently by democrats and radical republicans, the Moderates were only circles of intellectuals, aristocrats, soldiers and businessmen with patriotic tendencies. However, the Moderate Party wasn't cohesive, because its members were of different political ideologies, from continental liberalism to soft conservatism. Initially, the party wasn't too nationalist, preferring a federation or coalition between the several Italian states, and support both reformist and law and order policies, different by the republicans like Mazzini.
When the possibility of an unified Italian state became real, a new question of division was the form that the new Italian State would have. Someone, like Vincenzo Gioberti, supported a confederation of states, led by the Pope. other simply claimed for a centralized state headed by a monarch, without differences if a Savoy or other. There were three main tendencies inside the movement:

Neo-Guelphs:
 Vincenzo Gioberti
 Carlo Troya
 Alessandro Manzoni
 Terenzio della Rovere
 Pellegrino Rossi
 Antonio Rosmini-Serbati
 Gino Capponi
 Carlo Matteucci
 Luigi Tosti
Neutral:
 Gabrio Casati
 Cesare Alfieri di Sostegno
 Massimo d'Azeglio
 Luigi Settembrini
 Carlo Zucchi
 Ruggero Settimo
 Carlo Filangieri
Neo-Ghibellines:
 Cesare Balbo (switched side)
 Carlo Cattaneo (left for Action Party)
 Santorre de Rossi, Count of Santarosa
 Francesco Domenico Guerrazzi
 Giovanni Battista Niccolini
 Gabriele Rossetti
 Florestano Pepe
 Guglielmo Pepe

References

See also
 Liberalism and radicalism in Italy

Liberal parties in Italy
Italian unification
Kingdom of Sardinia
Defunct political parties in Italy
1848 establishments in Italy
Political parties established in 1848
1861 disestablishments in Italy
Defunct liberal political parties